The London Academy of Music and Dramatic Art (LAMDA) is a drama school located in Hammersmith, London. It is the oldest specialist drama school in the British Isles and a founding member of the Federation of Drama Schools.

LAMDA's Principal is Professor Mark O'Thomas, who succeeded Director Sarah Frankcom in 2022. Benedict Cumberbatch succeeded Timothy West as President of LAMDA's Board of Trustees in 2018.

The Academy's graduates work regularly at the Royal National Theatre, the Royal Shakespeare Company, Shakespeare's Globe, and the theatres of London's West End and Hollywood, as well as on the BBC, HBO, and Broadway. It is registered as a company under the name LAMDA Ltd and as a charity under its trading name London Academy of Music and Dramatic Art. There is an associate organisation in America under the name of American Friends of LAMDA (AFLAMDA). A very high proportion of LAMDA's stage management and technical theatre graduates find work in their chosen field within weeks of graduation. As of July 2022, LAMDA alumni have received 5 Academy Awards (out of 13 Oscar nominations), 9 SAG Awards, 13 Tonys, 15 Emmys, 19 Golden Globes, 21 BAFTAs, and 39 Olivier Awards.

LAMDA is also in partnership with the Fulbright Program. Each year one U.S. applicant is awarded a Fulbright Scholarship by the UK Fulbright Commission to study for a Master's degree in classical acting at the school.

LAMDA Examinations in the fields of speech, drama, communication, and performance are taken by external students and are recognised by Ofqual, the regulator in England, and its counterparts in Wales and Northern Ireland. LAMDA-accredited examinations at Level 3 or above are recognised within the UCAS Tariff system.

History
The London Academy of Music was founded by Henry Wylde in 1861; this makes the Academy the oldest of its kind in Britain, after - for example - the Royal Academy of Music (1822) and the Crystal Palace School of Art, Science, and Literature (1854). Originally located at St. James's Hall, it was divided into two compartments, one for women and one for men. The Academy began on 15 November 1861, at which time the cost per annum was 15guineas, or £15.75. The Academy accepted students for all ages "with a decided talent, or showing an aptitude for learning". Full scholarships were available.  The first philharmonic concert was held on 29 April 1863, following a public rehearsal on 25 April. It was a performance of Mendelssohn's Symphony No. 3.

Providing training for, and examinations in, various musical disciplines was originally the dominant purpose of the institution. However, providing instruction in spoken English quickly became a core area of the Academy's work.

In the 1880s, LAMDA began offering speech examinations to the public. Since then, these examinations have been refined and developed into a comprehensive system of performance evaluation. LAMDA Examinations has emerged as the largest Speech and Drama Board in the United Kingdom.

In 1904, the school was amalgamated with two other London music institutions that had sprung up since the academy was founded, namely the London Music School (founded 1865) and the Forest Gate School of Music (founded 1885) renamed in 1906 the Metropolitan Academy of Music. (The Metropolitan Academy of Music severed its links with the London Academy of Music in 1907.)  In due course the Hampstead Academy was also amalgamated. The name was changed to the current name in 1935, under the direction of Wilfrid Foulis. In 1939, it was moved from London due to the war; when it reopened in 1945, it no longer provided musical training.

LAMDA was previously an associate member of the Conservatoire for Dance and Drama, having joined in 2004, and received funding through the Conservatoire from the Office for Students. It left the Conservatoire on 31 July 2019 to become an independent institution, and now receives funding directly from the Office for Students and Research England.

In August 2021 it was announced that Sarah Frankcom would step down as Director, and that LAMDA was conducting a search for a successor. In August 2022, LAMDA announced that Professor Mark O'Thomas had been unanimously appointed by the Board of Trustees as principal and chief executive, with Dr. Philippa Standberg-Long appointed as head of actor training.

Facilities 

In 2003, LAMDA decided to move its teaching school and theatre to its current location in Hammersmith in West London. It acquired the old premises of the Royal Ballet School on Talgarth Road.

The move to the Talgarth Road enabled LAMDA to develop a campus with new training facilities designed by Niall McLaughlin Architects. The site was previously home to the Royal Ballet School, which moved to new, purpose-built facilities adjacent to the Royal Opera House.

The LAMDA complex has three theatres and various rehearsal spaces and meeting rooms. The three theatres are the Sainsbury Theatre, the Carne Studio Theatre and the Linbury Studio.

Boards and Honorary Fellows
Patron: Princess Alexandra, The Honourable Lady Ogilvy

Board of Trustees
President: Benedict Cumberbatch 
Vice-President: Dame Janet Suzman
Chairman: Shaun Woodward
Vice Chair: Tom Chandos, Sarah Habberfield
Other Board members: Shamez Alibhai, Matt Applewhite, Olga Basirov, Mark Cornell, Mohammad Dastbaz, Joanne Hirst, Patricia Hodge, Thomas Laing-Baker, April McMahon, John Owen, Carole-Anne Upton, Helen Wright

Honorary Fellows

Norman Ayrton
Eileen Collins
Colin Cook
Zoë Dominic
Michael Forrest
Brian Tilston

Notable alumni

 Edward Akrout – (The Hollow Crown, The Borgias)
 Angélica Aragón – (A Walk in the Clouds, Bella)
 Richard Armitage – (The Hobbit, Hannibal)
 Tala Ashe – (As the World Turns, Legends of Tomorrow)
 Colin Baker – (Doctor Who, The Brothers)
 Gabby Beans – (The Skin of Our Teeth)
 Haluk Bilginer – (Winter Sleep, The International)
 Jenny Boyd – (Legacies)
 Jim Broadbent – (Iris, Hot Fuzz)
 Cheryl Campbell - (Chariots of Fire, Call the Midwife)
 Kim Cattrall – (Sex and the City, Big Trouble in Little China)
 Sam Claflin – (The Hunger Games, Snow White and the Huntsman, Me Before You)
 Dominic Cooper – (Mamma Mia!, Captain America: The First Avenger, Preacher)
 Brian Cox – (Troy, The Bourne Identity)
 Benedict Cumberbatch – (Sherlock, Star Trek Into Darkness, The Imitation Game, Doctor Strange, Avengers: Infinity War)
 James D’Arcy – (Agent Carter, Cloud Atlas, W.E.)
 Alexis Denisof – (Angel, Buffy the Vampire Slayer)
 Diana Dors - (Oliver Twist, A Kid for Two Farthings, Yield to the Night)
 Chiwetel Ejiofor – (12 Years a Slave, Children of Men)
 Rosaline Elbay – (Kaleidoscope, Ramy)
 Jason Flemyng – (The League of Extraordinary Gentlemen, Snatch)
 Sarah Goldberg - (Clybourne Park, Barry)
 Tony Goldwyn – (Tarzan, Scandal, Ghost)
 Ginnifer Goodwin – (Once Upon a Time, Big Love, Zootopia)
 Richard Harris – (This Sporting Life, Harry Potter)
 Anthony Head – (Buffy the Vampire Slayer, Merlin)
 Edward Herrmann – (Gilmore Girls, The Lost Boys)
 William Hootkins – (Raiders of the Lost Ark, Batman)
 Lee Ingleby – (Harry Potter and the Prisoner of Azkaban, Inspector George Gently)
 Željko Ivanek – (Argo, Damages)
 Jeffrey Jones – (Ferris Bueller's Day Off, Beetlejuice)
 İlker Kaleli – (Poyraz Karayel, Kayip Şehir , Kayip, Silsile, Dip, Öğretmen)
 Stacy Keach – (American History X, Prison Break)
 Rory Kinnear – (James Bond, Penny Dreadful)
 Rose Leslie – (Game of Thrones, Downton Abbey)
 John Lithgow – (Shrek, Terms of Endearment)
 Archie Madekwe – (See, Gran Turismo)
 Meaghan Martin - (10 Things I Hate about You, Camp Rock)
 Malcolm McDowell – (A Clockwork Orange, Halloween)
 Natascha McElhone – (The Truman Show, Californication, Designated Survivor )
 Michael Malarkey - (The Vampire Diaries)
 Stephen Moyer – (True Blood, 88 Minutes)
 Avi Nash - (The Walking Dead, Learning to Drive)
 Alec Newman - (Frank Herbert's Dune, A Lonely Place to Die,The Last Kingdom)
 Vincenzo Nicoli - (The Dark Knight, Hank Zipzer, Alien³)
 David Oyelowo – (Selma, Rise of the Planet of the Apes)
 Joseph Quinn - (Stranger Things, Game of Thrones)
 Jemma Redgrave - (Doctor Who, Howards End)
 Iwan Rheon - (Misfits, Game of Thrones)
 Andrew Robinson – (Star Trek: Deep Space Nine, Dirty Harry)
 Samantha Robinson – (The Love Witch)
 Alexander Siddig – (Star Trek: Deep Space Nine, Game of Thrones)
 Roshan Seth - (Gandhi, Indiana Jones and the Temple of Doom)
 Daniel Sharman - (Teen Wolf, The Originals, Fear the Walking Dead)
 Charles Siebert – (Trapper John, MD, Mancuso, F.B.I., Sticks and Bones, The Gingerbread Lady)
 Gay Soper – (Godspell, The Flumps)
 David Suchet – (Agatha Christie's Poirot, Blott on the Landscape, Freud, Maxwell, Richard II, Peter Pan Goes Wrong)
 Donald Sutherland – (M*A*S*H, JFK, The Hunger Games)
 Luke Treadaway – (The Curious Incident of the Dog in the Night-Time (play), Unbroken, Cheerful Weather for the Wedding)
 Leon Vitali – (Barry Lyndon, Filmworker)
 Rita Wilson – (Sleepless in Seattle)
 Rosie Holt - (“The Russell Howard Show”)
 Ruth Wilson – (Luther, Saving Mr. Banks, His Dark Materials)
 Philip Winchester – (Camelot, Strike Back)

References

External links 

 

 
1861 establishments in England
Drama schools in London
Educational institutions established in 1861